John Henry Esling,  (born 5 June 1949) is a Canadian linguist specializing in phonetics. He is a Professor Emeritus of Linguistics at the University of Victoria, where he taught from 1981 to 2014. Esling was president of the International Phonetic Association from 2011 to 2015 and a co-editor of the 1999 Handbook of the International Phonetic Association.

His research primarily concerns the categorization, measurement and transcription of voice quality and vocal register, and the production and perception of laryngeal sounds.

Biography
Esling received a BA in History and Languages from Northwestern University in 1971, an MA in Linguistics and Applied Linguistics from the University of Michigan in 1972, and a PhD in Phonetics from the University of Edinburgh in 1978. His teachers at Michigan included J. C. Catford and Kenneth Pike, and at Edinburgh David Abercrombie and John Laver.

After teaching at the University of Leeds, Esling began working at the University of Victoria in 1981. He chaired its Linguistic Department between 2008 and 2013. He retired in 2014 with the title of a Professor Emeritus of Linguistics.

Esling was president of the International Phonetic Association from 2011 to 2015. He served as its Secretary from 1995 to 2003, and edited the Journal of the International Phonetic Association from 2003 to 2011. He co-edited the 1999 Handbook of the International Phonetic Association with Francis Nolan, and the 2011 18th edition of the Cambridge English Pronouncing Dictionary with Peter Roach and Jane Setter.

In 2009, he was elected a Fellow of the Royal Society of Canada.

Selected publications

References

Phoneticians
Linguists from Canada
Academic staff of the University of Victoria
Alumni of the University of Edinburgh
Fellows of the Royal Society of Canada
University of Michigan alumni
Northeastern University alumni
1949 births
Living people